Guðjón Guðmundsson (born 6 January 1952) is an Icelandic former breaststroke swimmer. He competed in two events at the 1972 Summer Olympics and was Icelandic Sportsperson of the Year for that year.

References

External links
 

1952 births
Living people
Icelandic male breaststroke swimmers
Olympic swimmers of Iceland
Swimmers at the 1972 Summer Olympics
People from Akranes